The Indian Ocean Naval Symposium (IONS) is a series of biennial meetings between the littoral states of the Indian Ocean region. It provides a forum to increase maritime security cooperation,discuss regional maritime issues, and promote friendly relationships among the member states.

History
The symposium was first held in 2008 with India as host.

The chairmanship and location of the Symposium rotates between the various member states.

Role 
IONS is a security construct for the Indian Ocean region which is similar to the Western Pacific Naval Symposium. It is a voluntary initiative among the navies and maritime security agencies of the member nations. In addition to the symposiums, numerous other activities like workshops, essay competitions and lectures are also held under the umbrella of the organization.

Members and observers 

The 25 member nations of the IONS are grouped into four sub-regions.

Members

Observers 
There are eight states with observer status:

List of symposiums 

The 7th edition of Indian Ocean Naval Symposium was held at Réunion, France. But during that, it was agreed upon to conduct the extant conclave of Chiefs in Paris. Eventually  in November 2021 the conclave was concluded in Paris, France.

References 

Indian Ocean
Security organizations